Spinellus is a genus of fungi in the Phycomycetaceae family. The widely distributed genus contains three species of pin mold that are parasitic on agaric mushrooms. The genus was circumscribed by Phillippe Edouard Leon van Tieghem in 1875.

Species
 Spinellus chalybeus
 Spinellus fusiger
 Spinellus sphaerosporus

References

External links
 

Zygomycota genera